The 2009–10 OK Liga Femenina was the second edition of Spain's premier women's rink hockey championship. This edition was the first one with Catalan teams, after the refusal of these to play the first edition due to the high cost of the travels during the competition.

Cerdanyola HC won its first title ever.

Teams

League table

Copa de la Reina

The 2010 Copa de la Reina was the 5th edition of the Spanish women's roller hockey cup. It was played in Vilanova i la Geltrú, between the first three qualified teams after the first half of the season and Vilanova as host team.

Cerdanyola won its first cup ever by beating Voltregà in the final with a goal of MVP Mònica Piosa with 13 seconds left.

References

External links
RFEP official website

2009 in roller hockey
2010 in roller hockey
OK Liga Femenina seasons